Assean River is a river in the Hudson Bay drainage basin in Northern Manitoba, Canada. Its flows from its source at Little Assean Lake to Clark Lake on the Nelson River.

See also
List of rivers of Manitoba

References

Rivers of Northern Manitoba
Tributaries of Hudson Bay